Shenyang Jianzhu University is a university in Shenyang, Liaoning, China under the provincial government.

External links
 Official English website
  Campus real three-dimensional map

Universities and colleges in Shenyang